XZ Andromedae (also known as XZ And) is a binary star in the constellation Andromeda. Its maximum apparent visual magnitude is 9.91, but drops down to 12.45 every 1.357 days. Its variability matches the behaviour of Algol variable stars.

System
The primary star of the system has a mass of 3.2  and has a spectral type A4IV-V, meaning that it has intermediate characteristics between a main sequence star and a subgiant one. The secondary is less massive (1.3 ) but larger than the primary, so it's an evolved subgiant star and its spectral type is G5IV. The secondary component will likely evolve into a white dwarf before the primary leaves the main sequence. Since 2019, it is suspected that the eclipsing binary is orbited by an additional two similar stars in a 1:3 mean-motion resonance with periods 33.43 and 100.4 years.

Variability
Photometric periods of Algol variables matches the orbital period of the system. However, in XZ Andromedae have been observed slight period variations that can be reproduced with three different cycles of 137.5, 36.8 and 11.2 years, respectively. Each of them could be the effect of another faint body orbiting the binary system, but one of the two shorter cycles could also be an effect of magnetic interaction between stars (the Applegate mechanism).

Other research  states that the long cycle is instead a long-term period increase caused by mass transfer from the secondary (that fills its Roche lobe) to the primary component.

References

Andromeda (constellation)
Andromedae, XZ
Durchmusterung objects
J01565151+4206021
Algol variables
4